Delphinium nuttallii is a species of Delphinium native to Washington and Oregon (the Columbia River Gorge) of the western United States. Its common names include Nuttall's larkspur and Columbia larkspur.

References 

nuttallii
Flora of Washington (state)
Flora of Oregon
Flora without expected TNC conservation status